Lord's Old Ground was a cricket venue in London that was established by Thomas Lord in 1787.  It was used mainly by Marylebone Cricket Club for major matches until 1810, after which a dispute about rent caused Lord to relocate.

Matches
The first match known to have been played at Lord's Old Ground was White Conduit Club v Middlessex on Monday 21 May 1787.

The first regular cricket fixture at Lord's which continues today was the annual Eton v Harrow match which was first played on the Old Ground in 1805.

The inaugural Gentlemen v Players match took place at the Old Ground in July 1806.

Location

Lord's Old Ground was on the site of what is now Dorset Square.  Lord relocated in 1811 to Lord's Middle Ground, a site at Lisson Grove in the vicinity of Regent's Park but he lost that venue after only three years because the land was requisitioned for a canal cutting.  In 1814, he opened the present Lord's Cricket Ground, formerly a duckpond in St John's Wood.

A commemorative plaque was unveiled in Dorset Square by Andrew Strauss on 9 May 2006.

References

External links
 Lord's
 CricInfo's page on the original Lord's

1787 establishments in England
Cricket grounds in Middlesex
Defunct cricket grounds in England
Defunct sports venues in London
English cricket in the 19th century
English cricket venues in the 18th century
History of Middlesex
Sports venues completed in 1787
Marylebone Cricket Club